These squads consisted of a maximum of 15 players.

Teams

Brazil

The following is the Brazil roster in the men's handball tournament of the 2004 Summer Olympics.

Head coach: Valmir Fassina

Croatia

The following is the Croatia roster in the men's handball tournament of the 2004 Summer Olympics.

Head coaches: Lino Červar

Egypt

The following is the Egypt roster in the men's handball tournament of the 2004 Summer Olympics.

Head coaches: Jorn-Uwe Lommel

France

The following is the France roster in the men's handball tournament of the 2004 Summer Olympics.

Head coach: Claude Onesta

Germany

The following is the Germany roster in the men's handball tournament of the 2004 Summer Olympics.

Head coaches: Heiner Brand

Greece

The following is the Greece roster in the men's handball tournament of the 2004 Summer Olympics.

Head coaches: Ulf Hakan Schefvert

Hungary

The following is the Hungary roster in the men's handball tournament of the 2004 Summer Olympics.

Head coaches: László Skaliczky

Iceland

The following is the Iceland roster in the men's handball tournament of the 2004 Summer Olympics.

Head coaches: Gudmundur Gudmundsson

South Korea

The following is the South Korea roster in the men's handball tournament of the 2004 Summer Olympics.

Head coaches: Kim Tae-hoon

Russia

The following is the Russia roster in the men's handball tournament of the 2004 Summer Olympics.

Head coaches: Vladimir Maksimov

Slovenia

The following is the Slovenia roster in the men's handball tournament of the 2004 Summer Olympics.

Head coaches: Tone Tiselj

Spain

The following is the Spain roster in the men's handball tournament of the 2004 Summer Olympics.

Head coaches: Cesar Argiles

References

External links
2004 Summer Olympics Official Report

Mens Squads
2004
Men's events at the 2004 Summer Olympics